Clément Dupont (11 April 1899 – 1 November 1993) was a French rugby union player who competed in the 1924 Summer Olympics. He was born in Argelès-Gazost and died in Bordeaux. In 1924 he won the silver medal as a member of the French team.

References

External links
profile

1899 births
1993 deaths
Sportspeople from Hautes-Pyrénées
French rugby union players
Olympic rugby union players of France
Rugby union players at the 1924 Summer Olympics
Olympic silver medalists for France
France international rugby union players
Medalists at the 1924 Summer Olympics
20th-century French people